Yeşilköy is a village in Mut district of Mersin Province, Turkey. It is situated in the west side of  Göksu River in the Taurus Mountains. The population of the village was 289 as of 2012.

References

Villages in Mut District